The 2009 South Alabama Jaguars football team represented the University of South Alabama in the 2009 NCAA Division I FCS football season. They were led by first-year head coach Joey Jones and played their home games at Ladd–Peebles Stadium. The Jaguars, playing as an independent in their inaugural season, played an abbreviated season of seven games, none of which were against any other Division I teams, and most of which were against prep schools. The Jaguars completed their season with an undefeated record of seven wins and zero losses (7–0).

Schedule

References

South Alabama
South Alabama Jaguars football seasons
College football undefeated seasons
South Alabama Jaguars football